Wakanoyama Hiroshi (born May 12, 1972 as Hiroshi Nishizaki) is a former sumo wrestler from Gobo, Wakayama Prefecture, Japan. His highest rank was komusubi.

Career
Wakanoyama made his professional debut in March 1988. Joining at the same time as him were future yokozuna Akebono, Takanohana and Wakanohana, and ōzeki Kaiō. He began wrestling under his own surname, Nishizaki, but from November 1989 onwards adopted the shikona of Wakanoyama, the name adapted from his home prefecture. He reached sekitori status in July 1991 upon promotion to the second highest jūryō division, and made his debut in the top makuuchi division in May 1992. However, he lasted only four tournaments there before being demoted back to jūryō. Although he reappeared in makuuchi once in September 1994, he could not stay there. In July 1996 he fell back to the unsalaried makushita division where he languished for thirteen tournaments, before winning promotion back to jūryō in November 1998 and makuuchi in July 1999.

Wakanoyama had been absent from the top division for 28 tournaments. No other wrestler had ever managed to return to makuuchi after so long away. His remarkable comeback may have been helped by the fact that during this period his stable, Musashigawa, had become one of the strongest in sumo, with a yokozuna (Musashimaru), and three soon to reach ōzeki (Musōyama, Dejima and Miyabiyama). Wakanoyama was certainly not short of strong training partners.

Wakanoyama was able to hold his own in the top division this time, rising slowly up the rankings. In March 2000, ranked at maegashira 1, he faced yokozuna Wakanohana on the opening day. The last time the two had fought was eight years previously in May 1992. This is the longest ever gap between meetings in the top division. Wakanoyama lost the match and fell short with a 6-9 record, but in January 2001 he scored 9-6 at maegashira 3 and won his first ever special prize. In the following tournament he was promoted to komusubi, the highest rank he was to achieve. He was the first non-foreign and non-college wrestler from his stable to reach a sanyaku rank. He fought his last tournament in the top division in March 2004, and retired in September 2005 at the age of thirty three.

Retirement from sumo
Wakanoyama remained in the sumo world as an elder, or oyakata, affiliated to Musashigawa stable where he worked as a coach under the name Yamawake-oyataka. However, he left the Sumo Association in September 2010.

Fighting style
Wakanoyama was a pusher-thruster, preferring tsuki/oshi techniques to fighting on the mawashi. His most common winning kimarite was a straightforward oshi-dashi, or push out.

Career record

See also
List of sumo tournament second division champions
Glossary of sumo terms
List of past sumo wrestlers
List of komusubi

References

External links

1972 births
Living people
Japanese sumo wrestlers
Sumo people from Wakayama Prefecture
Komusubi
People from Gobō, Wakayama